12th km is a rural locality (a settlement) in Luchkinskoye Rural Settlement of Khorolsky District, Russia. The population was 7 as of 2010.

Geography 
The settlement is located 8 km from Luchki.

Streets 
There is no streets with titles.

References 

Rural localities in Primorsky Krai